The Annunciation Cathedral  (also called the Armenian Catholic Cathedral of Cairo) is a religious building affiliated with the Catholic Church that follows the Armenian rite and is located on Mohamed Sabri Street, Abou Alam, Abdine in Cairo, Egypt.

The temple opened in 1926 serves as the headquarters of the Armenian Diocese of Iskanderiya also known as the Armenian Catholic Eparchy of Alexandria (Eparchia Alexandrina Armenorum) which was created in 1885 by Pope Leo XIII to meet the religious needs of the region's Catholic Armenians .

The cathedral is under the pastoral responsibility of Bishop Kricor-Okosdinos Coussa.

See also

Roman Catholicism in Egypt

References

Armenian Catholic cathedrals
Armenian diaspora in Egypt
Cathedrals in Cairo
Eastern Catholic cathedrals in Egypt